Elisabeth is a Viennese, German-language musical commissioned by the Vereinigte Bühnen Wien (VBW), with a book and lyrics by Michael Kunze and music by Sylvester Levay. It portrays the life and death of Empress Elisabeth of Austria, also known as "Sisi", wife of Emperor Franz Joseph I,  from her engagement and marriage in 1854 to her murder in 1898 at the hands of the Italian anarchist Luigi Lucheni, through the lens of her growing obsession with death, as her marriage and her empire crumble around her at the turn of the century. 

It has been translated into seven languages and seen by over ten million spectators worldwide, making it the most successful German-language musical of all time. , it has not been staged in English-speaking countries.

Synopsis

The show opens in the "world of the dead", where Luigi Lucheni is being interrogated by a Judge as to why he has murdered the Empress Elisabeth. Lucheni claims that he did no more than what Elisabeth herself wanted, since all her life Elisabeth has been in love with Death himself – and vice versa. As his witnesses, Lucheni brings back the dead aristocracy of the bygone era and takes us to the past, where he serves as a sarcastic narrator of the events that lead to the transformation of the sweet and innocent Sisi to the revered and infamous Elisabeth, Empress of Austria and Queen of Hungary, and her decline through later years until her assassination.

At a young age, Sisi, grown up in a seemingly sorrowless environment, experiences her first encounter with Death, which launches a love–hate affair that will span her entire life.
Lucheni claims that once Franz Joseph, the Emperor of Austria, picks Elisabeth as his bride – for once opposing his domineering mother Sophie – he begins a chain of events that will eventually topple the Habsburg Empire. Elisabeth herself very soon comes to regret her seemingly "fairy-tale marriage". She feels abandoned by her careless husband, psychologically abused by her possessive mother-in-law, and is chronically depressed due to her loneliness. There is only one thing that keeps her emotionally stimulated—the dark and sensual shadow of Death; but Elisabeth is reluctant to consummate their relationship. When Death takes her infant daughter, the tragedy shakes the young Empress extremely, but she refuses to give in to Death's sway.

After her other two children, including her only son Rudolf, are taken away by Sophie, Elisabeth calluses over and becomes cold and selfish. She flees the Austrian court and spends decades restlessly travelling all over the world, trying in vain to escape from her fear of emptiness. Eventually, Elisabeth makes peace with her husband and finds new meaning in her life when she helps unify Austria and Hungary, but her newfound purpose makes her neglect her psychologically delicate son even further, sending young Rudolf into deep depression and causing him to bond with Death.

Eventually, Rudolf's own loneliness and his father's pressure cause him to snap and he embraces Death, committing suicide at Mayerling with his mistress, Mary Vetsera. This event completely breaks down Elisabeth and she begs Death to take her. However, her scorned lover now refuses to take her in.

Another decade goes by. Elisabeth still wanders from place to place, dressed in permanent mourning. Franz Joseph visits her from time to time, begging her to return home to Vienna, firmly believing that love is the answer to all sorrows, but Elisabeth refuses, citing that sometimes love is simply not enough to cure old wounds.

Finally, in a horrifying vision of the fall of the House of Habsburg, Franz Joseph at last meets his mysterious rival. He watches as Death throws Lucheni a dagger, but crushed by the weight of his imperial crest, he is powerless to save his wife.

On September 10, 1898, while on her way to board a ship in Geneva, Empress Elisabeth of Austria is mortally wounded, stabbed right in the heart with a crudely sharpened file. As she lies dying, Death comes to claim her spirit with a kiss. With their embrace, the show ends.

Principal characters
Elisabeth, the Empress of Austria and later Queen of Hungary. Nickname is Sisi. Her birthplace is the Kingdom of Bavaria in Germany.
Death, the personification of the abstract concept of "Death" or the "Grim Reaper". His appearance is modeled on the poet Heinrich Heine who was fascinated by Elisabeth, and the rock singer David Bowie.
Luigi Lucheni, an Italian anarchist and Elisabeth's assassin. He plays the role of a plot device in the story.
Franz Joseph, the Emperor of Austria and later King of Hungary. Husband of Elisabeth.
Archduchess Sophie, Franz Joseph's autocratic mother.
Rudolf, Elisabeth and Franz Joseph's son.
Max, Prince of the Kingdom of Bavaria in Germany. Elisabeth's father.
Ludovika, Princess of the Kingdom of Bavaria in Germany. Elisabeth's mother and Sophie's younger sister.
Helene, Elisabeth's elder sister.
Countess Esterházy, the Mistress of the Household
Count Grünne, Franz Joseph's advisor
Cardinal Archbishop Rauscher, the head of the Roman Catholic Church in Austria
Prince Schwarzenberg, the State Minister
Frau Wolf, the mistress of a brothel in Vienna

Production history
The world premiere of Elisabeth, directed by Harry Kupfer, took place on September 3, 1992, at the Theater an der Wien in Vienna, Austria, where it ran until January 1997. After a brief hiatus, it reopened on September 4, 1997. The final closing date was on April 25, 1998. In October 2002, a 10th Anniversary miniseries of concerts took place at the Wiener Konzerthaus in Vienna. The Vienna production was revived on October 1, 2003, and ran until December 4, 2005.
Other productions have been mounted in the following countries.
Japan: The Takarazuka Grand Theatre (The Takarazuka Revue), Hyōgo
 February 16, 1996 - current
Japan: The Tokyo Takarazuka Theatre (The Takarazuka Revue), Tokyo
 June 3, 1996 - current
Hungary: The Open-Air Theatre of Szeged, Szeged
 August 17, 1996 - September/October 1996
Hungary: The Operetta Theatre (Budapesti Operett Színház), Budapest
 October 5, 1996 - January 2005
 July 2007 -
Hungary: The National Theatre of Miskolc
 Autumn 1999 - April 2001
Hungary: Katona József National Theatre of Kecskemét
 October 2021 -
Sweden: Musiktheatern i Värmland, Karlstad
 September 30, 1999 - January 9, 2000
Netherlands: Fortis Circus Theatre (Stage Entertainment), Scheveningen
 November 21, 1999 - July 22, 2001
Japan: The Toho Company 1st version 
 June 6 - August 30, 2000 – Imperial Theater, Tokyo
 March 30 - April 28, 2001 – Imperial Theater, Tokyo
 May 3–27, 2001 – Chunichi Theater, Nagoya
 August 3–31, 2001 – Umeda Arts Theater, Osaka
 October 4–31, 2001 – Hakataza Theater, Fukuoka
Germany: Colosseum Theater (Stage Entertainment), Essen
 March 22, 2001 - June 29, 2003
Japan: The Toho Company 2nd version
 March 6 - May 30, 2004 – Imperial Theater, Tokyo
 August 1–30, 2004 – Chunichi Theater, Nagoya
 October 2–28, 2004 – Hakataza Theater, Fukuoka
 November 3 - December 12, 2004 – Umeda Arts Theater, Osaka
 September 1–30, 2005 – Imperial Theater, Tokyo
 May 3–28, 2006 – Nissay Theater, Tokyo
 August 3–28, 2008 – Chunichi Theater, Nagoya
 September 3–28, 2008 – Hakataza Theater, Fukuoka
 November 3 - December 25, 2008 – Nissay Theater, Tokyo
 January 8 - February 2, 2009 – Umeda Arts Theater, Osaka
 August 9 - October 30, 2010 – Imperial Theater, Tokyo. Toho "Elisabeth" 10th anniversary production
 May 9 - June 27, 2012 – Imperial Theater, Tokyo
 July 5–26, 2012 – Hakataza Theater, Fukuoka
 August 3–26, 2012 – Chunichi Theater, Nagoya
 September 1–28, 2012 – Umeda Arts Theater, Osaka
Germany: Apollo Theater (Stage Holding/Stage Entertainment), Stuttgart
 March 6, 2005 - September 17, 2006
Germany: Theater des Westens (Semmel Concerts/Premium Entertainment), Berlin
 April 20 - September 27, 2008
 October 2008 - April 2010 (toured throughout Germany, Switzerland, Belgium, and Austria. See tour dates below.)
Italy: Miramare Castle, Trieste. Open-Air Concert Version.
 July 21–27, 2004; July 31 - August 6, 2005
Finland: Turun Kaupunginteatteri (The Municipal Theatre of Turku), Turku
 September 23, 2005 - December 30, 2006
Switzerland: Thunersee, Thun. Open-Air Theatre.
 July 19 - August 30, 2006
Japan: Umeda Arts Theater, Osaka. Original Vienna Production.
 March 28 - April 30, 2007
South Korea: Samsung Electronics Hall, Seoul
 February 9 - May 13, 2012
Austria: Raimund Theater, Vienna. Elisabeth: 20th Anniversary Revival
 September 5, 2012 - February 1, 2014
Japan: Elisabeth in Concert: 20th Anniversary
 October 15–22, 2012 – Umeda Arts Theater, Osaka
October 26–31, 2012 – Tokyu Orb Theater, Tokyo
South Korea: 
 July 26 - September 7, 2013 – Seoul Art Center Opera House, Seoul
 September 14–15, 2013 – Busan Cultural Center, Busan
 October 19–20, 2013 – Seongsan Art Hall, Changwon
China: Shanghai Cultural Square, Shanghai
 December 9, 2014 - January 11, 2015
Japan: The Toho Company 3rd version
 June 13 - August 26, 2015 – Imperial Theater, Tokyo
 June 28 - July 26, 2016 – Imperial Theater, Tokyo
 August 6 - September 4, 2016 – Hakataza Theater, Fukuoka
 September 11–30, 2016 – Umeda Arts Theater, Osaka
 October 8–23, 2016 – Chunichi Theater, Nagoya
 June 7 - August 26, 2019 – Imperial Theater, Tokyo
 April 9 - May 4, 2020 - Imperial Theater, Tokyo (cancelled due to COVID-19)
 May 11 - June 2, 2020 - Umeda Arts Theater, Osaka (cancelled due to COVID-19)
 June 10–28, 2020 - Misonoza Theater, Nagoya (cancelled due to COVID-19)
 July 6 - August 3, 2020 - Hakataza Theater, Fukuoka (cancelled due to COVID-19)
 October 9 - November 27, 2022 - Imperial Theater, Tokyo
 December 5–21, 2022 - Misonoza Theater, Nagoya
 December 29, 2022 - January 3, 2023 - Umeda Arts Theater, Osaka
 January 11–31, 2023 - Hakataza Theater, Nagoya
South Korea: Samsung Electronics Hall, Seoul
 June 13 - September 6, 2015
European Tour: Germany & Austria
 February 26 - March 22, 2015 – Essen, Germany; Colosseum Theater
 March 26 - June 7, 2015 – Munich, Germany
 July 7 - August 9, 2015 – Linz, Austria
 December 16, 2015 - January 3, 2016 – Frankfurt am Main, Germany
 January 7 - February 14, 2016 – Berlin, Germany
Netherlands: Elisabeth in Concert
 June 12–17, 2017 – Paleis Het Loo, Apeldoorn
 June 8–24, 2018 – Paleis Soestdijk, Baarn
South Korea: Blue Square (theater), Seoul
 November 17, 2018 - February 10, 2019
Austria: Open-air concert at Schönbrunn Palace
 June 25–26, 2019
 June 25–27, 2020 (cancelled due to COVID-19)
 July 1–3, 2021 (cancelled due to COVID-19)
 June 30 - July 2, 2022 (the play was canceled on July 1, 2022 due to the storm in the evening)
France: Château Du Karreveld 
August 2022

Song list
Additional songs have been added for some productions of Elisabeth that are not featured in all productions. Also the order of songs is often switched, which is the most noticeable between the German and the Viennese versions. This song list and order, with titles in English, is based upon the original Vienna production except where noted.

Act One:
 Prologue (Prolog) - Judge, Lucheni, Death
 Like You (Wie du) - Elisabeth, Max
 Lovely to Have You All Here - (Schön, euch alle zu seh'n) Ludovika, Hélène, Family
 No Coming Without Going (Kein Kommen ohne Geh'n) - Death (Hungarian, Japanese, 2012 and 2022 Vienna productions only (sung by Death and Elisabeth in 2012 and 2022 Vienna production))
 Black Prince (Schwarzer Prinz) - Elisabeth (originally a direct reprise of Like You, rewritten for the Dutch premiere and subsequent productions, cut in 2012 Vienna production)
 To Each He Gives His Own (Jedem gibt er das Seine) - Sophie, Franz-Joseph, the Court
 Things Never Happen As Planned (So wie man plant und denkt...) - Lucheni, Sophie, Hélène, Elisabeth, Franz-Joseph
 Nothing is Difficult Any More (Nichts ist schwer) - Franz-Joseph, Elisabeth
 All Questions Have Been Asked (Alle Fragen sind gestellt) - Wedding Chorus (and Death in Japanese productions)
 She Doesn't Fit (Sie passt nicht) - Sophie, Max, Wedding Guests
 The Last Dance (Der letzte Tanz) - Death
 An Empress Must Shine (Eine Kaiserin muss glänzen) - Sophie, Countess Esterházy, Ladies-in-Waiting
 I Belong to Me (Ich Gehör Nur Mir) - Elisabeth
 The First Four Years (Die Ersten Vier Jahre) - Lucheni, Elisabeth, Sophie, Ladies-in-Waiting, Franz-Joseph, The Court, Hungarians (finale completely rewritten for the Takarazuka production and partially for the Hungarian version.)
 The Shadows Grow Longer (Die Schatten werden länger) (Preview) - Death
 The Cheerful Apocalypse (Die fröhliche Apokalypse) - Lucheni, a Student, a Journalist, a Poet, a Bohemian, a Professor, coffeehouse patrons
 Child or Not (Kind oder nicht) - Sophie, Countess Esterházy, Young Rudolf (appears from the German premiere and subsequent productions, except the Takarazuka production)
 Elisabeth, Open Up My Angel (Elisabeth, mach auf mein Engel) - Franz-Joseph, Elisabeth, Death
 Milk (Milch)  - Lucheni, the Poor (and Death in the Takarazuka production)
 Beauty Care (Schönheitspflege) - Countess Esterházy, Ladies-in-Waiting
 I Just Want to Tell You (Ich will dir nur sagen) (I Belong to Me Reprise) - Franz-Joseph, Elisabeth, Death (originally only Franz-Joseph and Elisabeth in the original Vienna and Hungarian productions)

Act Two:
 Kitsch (Kitsch) - Lucheni
 Éljen (which is Hungarian for "long live...") (Éljen) - Hungarian Crowds, Lucheni (andDeath in Japanese productions) 
 When I Want to Dance (Wenn ich tanzen will) - Death, Elisabeth (written for the German premiere and appears in subsequent productions, sans the Hungarian staging and omitted in Stage Entertainment productions)
 Mama, Where Are You? (Mama, wo bist du?) - Young Rudolf, Death
 Mama, Where Are You? (reprise) (Mama, wo bist du reprise) - Young Rudolf, Death (Original Dutch production only; the scene was inserted into the gap made by moving the earlier song into act one)
 She Is Insane (Sie ist verrückt) - Elisabeth, Miss Windisch
 Nothing, Nothing, Nothing at All (Nichts, nichts, gar nichts) - Elisabeth (originally a dance-sequence with Elisabeth as Titania from A Midsummer Night's Dream, missing the second half of the song in the Takarazuka production)
 I Belong To Me (Ich Gehör Nur Mir reprise) - Elisabeth (Takarazuka productions only)
 Us or Her (Wir oder sie) - Sophie, The Court
 Don't Play the Prude (Nur kein Genieren) - Madame Wolf, Lucheni, Whores
 The Last Chance (Or 'The Malady') (Die letzte Chance (Maladie)) - Death, Elisabeth
 Between Dream and Reality (Zwischen Traum und Wirklichkeit) - Elisabeth (Toho 2000-2001 Japanese productions only, also recorded for the Stuttgart production cast recording, though not utilised in the actual show)
 Argument between Mother and Son - Franz Josef & Sophie (Streit Mutter und Sohn) (proceeds Sophie's solo "Bellaira")
 Bellaria (Bellaria) - Sophie (Primarily appeared in Hungarian and Japanese productions starting in 1996; Has been present in all productions since then, except for the Takarazuka production)
 The Restless Years (Die rastlosen Jahre) - Franz-Joseph, The Court, Ladies-in-Waiting, Lucheni
 Hunt (Jagd) - A sequence referencing Elisabeth's hunting trips in Europe in the original Viennese production (deleted in all but the Hungarian production)
 The Shadows Grow Longer (Die Schatten werden länger (Reprise)) - Death, Rudolf
 Argument Between Father and Son (Streit Vater & Sohn) - Rudolf, Franz Joseph (first seen in the Dutch and Essen productions, then inserted into the Viennese revival and subsequent German productions)
 Hate (Hass) - Anti-Semites & Lucheni (cut from the Takarazuka productions due to controversial content)
 Conspiracy (Verschwörung) - Rudolf, Hungarian Nationalists, Death(does not appear in the Vienna production; expanded for the Takarazuka version)
 Like You (Wie du (Reprise)) - Elisabeth, Max's Ghost (does not appear in the Takarazuka production)
 If I Were Your Mirror (Wenn ich dein Spiegel wär) - Rudolf, Elisabeth
 The Mayerling Waltz (Mayerling-Walzer) - Rudolf, Death, Mary Vetsera (orchestrations expanded in the Takarazuka production since the Star Troupe 1996 performance and used for current productions)
 Rudolf, Where Are You? (Dirge) (Rudolf, wo bist du? (Totenklage)) - Elisabeth (a duet with Sophie's Ghost in the Dutch and Hungarian productions)
 No Coming Without Going (Kein Kommen ohne Geh'n Reprise) - Death (Takarazuka productions only)
 My New Assortment (Mein neues Sortiment) (Kitsch reprise) - Lucheni
 Ships in the Night (Boote in der Nacht) - Elisabeth, Franz-Joseph
 On the Deck of the Sinking World (Am Deck der sinkenden Welt) - Lucheni, Death, Franz-Joseph, the Habsburgs (Missing first half of the song in the Takarazuka stagings)
 The Veil Descends (Der Schleier fällt) - Elisabeth, Death
 Closing Music (Schlussapplaus) - Instrumental (Length and assortment of themes vary from production to production)

CD and DVD releases

, there have been a total of at least twenty-five cast albums, complete works, demos, and promotional albums/singles, as well as eight commercial DVDs of the show, released to the public. These releases do not include countless other artists' solo albums and special compilations that also feature songs from the musical. Listed here are a few from the more mainstream, or better-known, productions.

VIENNA 1992 Elisabeth — original cast recording (Originalaufnahmen aus dem Musical Elisabeth)
Elisabeth: Pia Douwes, Der Tod: Uwe Kröger, Luigi Lucheni: Ethan Freeman
Producer – Jimmy Bowien 
Polydor GMBH - 513 792-2

VIENNA 1996 Elisabeth — complete live recording (Live aus dem Theater an der Wien Gesamtaufnahme des Musicals Elisabeth)
Elisabeth: Maya Hakvoort, Der Tod: Addo Kruizinga, Luigi Lucheni: Bruno Grassini
Polydor GMBH - 531 481-2
On 19 and 20 January 1996, a complete live recording was made of the original Vienna run.

SCHEVENINGEN 1999 Elisabeth — original Dutch cast album
Elisabeth: Pia Douwes, De Dood: Stanley Burleson, Luigi Luicheni: Wim van den Driessche
Polydor - 543 335-2

ESSEN 2001 Elisabeth — original German cast album (Highlights der deutschen Urauffürung im Colosseum Theater Essen)
Elisabeth: Pia Douwes, Der Tod: Uwe Kröger, Luigi Lucheni: Carsten Lepper
Polydor GMBH - 549 800-2

VIENNA 2004 Elisabeth — Revival cast recording (Aktuelles Cast Album, Wien)
Elisabeth: Maya Hakvoort, Der Tod: Máté Kamarás, Luigi Luicheni: Serkan Kaya
HitSquad Records 6680530

VIENNA 2005 Elisabeth — complete live recording (Gesamtaufnahme live aus dem Theater an der Wien)
Elisabeth: Maya Hakvoort, Der Tod: Máté Kamarás, Luigi Luicheni: Serkan Kaya, Kaiser Franz Joseph: André Bauer, Erzherzogin Sophie: Else Ludwig, Erzherzog Rudolf: Fritz Schmid
HitSquad Records 668262
On 30 and 31 October 2005, a complete live recording of the Vienna Revival was made. A more popular item among fans is a DVD of the show recorded on these same two nights. A November 2007 release of the same live recording in widescreen spread over 2 DVDs also boasts a 1-disc companion with a short history of backstage interviews, pictures, and production videos from the last thirteen years of the musical, subtitled in English and Japanese.
CDs and DVDs have also been released for each of the nine Japanese productions of the Takarazuka Revue since 2016, and additionally for the Japanese 10th anniversary concert in February 2006. A CD has been released for the Vienna 10th anniversary concert which was staged in 2002.

Notes
 The Vienna Revival also went on to tour Japan in 2007. It opened in Osaka at the Umeda Arts Theatre on March 28, 2007, and showed 40 performances through April 30, 2007. On May 7, 2007, the production opened (in concert version) at the Koma Stadium Theatre in Tokyo. The Japan Tour of the Vienna Revival run ended on May 20, 2007.
 For two consecutive summers, these special, week-long invitational concerts were held by the historic Miramare Castle to promote the Vienna Revival. These performances were held during the show's annual summer pause, and several cast members from the Vienna Revival participated. The concerts were performed in German and Italian.
 Elisabeth premiered in the Hungarian language at The Open-Air Theatre of Szeged in August 1996. The Budapest production that premiered at The Operetta Theatre in October 1996, took over the repertoire for the previous Open-Air production. Between the years of 1996 and 2005, with allowance for casting changes and the use of the theatre's space for other various events, subsequent productions were held (including the Miskolc run). The Hungarian production has a running history of eight years, the longest running, un-interrupted Elisabeth production in the world.
A new production of the musical with a partially new cast opened at the Operetta Theatre in Budapest in July 2007. Since then, Elisabeth enjoys a regular run at The Operetta Theatre.
 Since 1996, the musical has been performed at least once by each of the five troupes of the all-female Japanese Takarazuka Revue.
Yukigumi/Snow Troupe- The Takarazuka Grand Theatre (February 16 - March 25, 1996); The Tokyo Takarazuka Theatre (June 3–30, 1996)
Reprise: The Takarazuka Grand Theatre (May 4 - June 18, 2007); The Tokyo Takarazuka Theatre (July 6 - August 12, 2007)
Hoshigumi/Star Troupe- The Takarazuka Grand Theater (November 8 - December 16, 1996); The Tokyo Takarazuka Theater (March 4–31, 1997)
Soragumi/Cosmos Troupe- The Takarazuka Grand Theater (October 30 - December 20, 1998); The 1000 Days Theater (February 19 - March 29, 1999)
Hanagumi/Flower Troupe- The Takarazuka Grand Theater (October 4 - November 18, 2002); The Tokyo Takarazuka Theater (January 2 - February 9, 2003)
Reprise: The Takarazuka Grand Theatre (July 22 - August 22, 2014); The Tokyo Takarazuka Theatre (October 11 - November 16, 2014)
Tsukigumi/Moon Troupe- The Takarazuka Grand Theater (February 4 - March 21, 2005); The Tokyo Takarazuka Theatre (April 28 - May 22, 2005)
Reprise: The Takarazuka Grand Theatre (May 22 - June 22, 2009); The Tokyo Takarazuka Theatre (July 10 - August 9, 2009)
After its run in Berlin, the Semmel Concerts production of Elisabeth proceeded to tour Germany, Switzerland, Belgium, and Austria. Dates for the Semmel Concerts Tour are as follows:
Zurich-Oerlikon, Switzerland- Theater 11 (October 17, 2008 - January 4, 2009)
Antwerp, Belgium- Stadsschouburg Antwerpen (March 22 - April 19, 2009)
Munich, Germany- Deutsches Theater (October 21 - December 12, 2009)
Frankfurt, Germany- Alte Oper (December 18, 2009 - January 14, 2010)
Bremen, Germany- Musical Theater Bremen (January 19 - February 14, 2010)
Bregenz, Austria- Festspielhaus (February 24 - March 10, 2010)
Düsseldorf, Germany - Capitol Theater (March 18 - April 25, 2010)
After its run in Seoul, Interpark revealed other cities EMK Musical Company's 2013 production of the Korean version of Elisabeth will travel to and perform in South Korea. Dates are as follows:
Busan, South Korea- Busan Cultural Center (September 14–15, 2013)
Daegu, South Korea- Keimyung Art Center (September 21–22, 2013)
Gwangju, South Korea- Gwangju Culture & Art Center (September 28–29, 2013)
Changwon, South Korea- Sungsan Art Hall (October 19–20, 2013)

References

External links

 Stacy's Musicals: Elisabeth info page (English)
 Website for the current Semmel Concerts production in Berlin (German)
 Official website for the Budapest Operetta Theatre (Hungarian & English)
 Official English website for the Vienna Revival production (German & English)
 Official Website for the Vienna Revival Japan Tour (Japanese)
 Official website for the 2014 Takarazuka production (Japanese)
 Official website for the Toho production of Japanese Elisabeth (Japanese)
 Official fan club for the Stage Entertainment production in Stuttgart (German)
 Official Thunerseespiele website for the Swiss production- Videos and Picture Gallery only (German)
 Official website for the original Stage Entertainment production in Scheveningen (Dutch)
 Official website for EMK Musical Company's production of "Korea's Elisabeth: The Elisabeth in Korea" (Korean)

1992 musicals
Biographical musicals
Cultural depictions of Empress Elisabeth of Austria
Cultural depictions of Franz Joseph I of Austria
Fiction about personifications of death
German musicals
Musicals by Michael Kunze
Musicals by Sylvester Levay
Plays set in the 19th century
Plays set in Austria
Sung-through musicals